One Kiss for Old Times' Sake is Ronnie Dove's second album for Diamond Records.

History

The album was released on the strength of two hit singles, "A Little Bit of Heaven" and "One Kiss for Old Times’ Sake", both of which were Top 20 pop hits.  

The album peaked at number 119 on the Billboard 200 chart.

The album was reissued on CD in the mid 1990s, being paired with Dove’s I'll Make All Your Dreams Come True album. More recently, the album was reissued digitally by Ronnie Dove Music, with a few songs sourced from newly available tapes that were previously unavailable.

Track listing

References

1965 albums
Ronnie Dove albums